Kota Srinivasa Rao (born 10 July 1947) is an Indian character actor known for his work primarily in Telugu cinema and Telugu theatre. He has also starred in a few films in Tamil, Hindi, Kannada and Malayalam. As a former politician, Rao has served as the MLA from Vijayawada East in Andhra Pradesh, India from 1999 to 2004. He made his debut with the Telugu film Pranam Khareedu in 1978. He starred in over 750 feature films. He has received nine state Nandi Awards in various categories of villain, character actor, and supporting actor. In 2012, he has garnered the SIIMA Award for his work in Krishnam Vande Jagadgurum. In 2015, he received India's fourth highest civilian honour Padma Shri for his contribution to Indian cinema.

He received wide critical acclaim for his diverse roles in films such as S/O Satyamurthy (2015), Attarintiki Daredi (2013), Rakta Charitra (2010), Leader (2010), Ready (2008), Pellaina Kothalo (2006), Sarkar (2006), Bommarillu (2006), Chatrapathi (2005), Athadu (2005), Aa Naluguru (2004), Malliswari (2004), Idiot (2002), Prudhvi Narayana (2002), Chinna (2000), Ganesh (1998), Anaganaga Oka Roju (1997), Little Soldiers (1996), Aame (1994), Hello Brother (1994), Teerpu (1994), Govindha Govindha (1993), Gaayam (1993),  Money (1993), Sathruvu (1990), Siva (1989), Aha Naa Pellanta (1987), Pratighatana (1986), and Repati Pourulu (1986). In 2003, he made his debut in the Tamil industry with Saamy as a suave villain.

Personal life
Kota Srinivasa Rao was born on 10 July 1942 in the village of Kankipadu in present-day Andhra Pradesh. His father Seetha Rama Anjaneyulu was a doctor. Srinivasa initially aimed to become a doctor but eventually couldn't make it because of his love towards acting. He started his career on stage in plays during college. He has a Bachelor of Science degree and worked as a State Bank employee before entering the film industry.

He is married to Rukmini and has three children (2 daughters and a son). He lost his son Kota Venkata Anjaneya Prasad on 20 June 2010 in a road accident in Hyderabad. Prasad acted in J. D. Chakravarthy's flick Siddham and alongside his father in Gaayam 2 (2010). His acting was critically acclaimed.

Srinivasa's younger brother Kota Sankara Rao is also an actor. He works in a nationalised bank and acts in soap operas.

Awards

Civilian Honours
Padma Shri (2015)

Nandi Awards
 Special Jury Award – Pratighatana (1985)
 Best Villain – Gaayam (1993)
 Best Villain – Teerpu (1994)
 Best Character Actor – Little Soldiers (1996)
 Best Villain – Ganesh (1998)
 Best Villain – Chinna (2000)
 Best Supporting Actor – Prudhvi Narayana (2002)
 Best Character Actor – Aa Naluguru (2004)
 Best Character Actor – Pellaina Kothalo (2006)

SIIMA Awards 
South Indian International Movie Award – Best Supporting Actor – Krishnam Vande Jagadgurum (2012)

Other honours
 Allu Ramalingaiah Puraskaram

Filmography

As actor

Telugu

Tamil

Hindi

Malayalam

Kannada

Dakhini

As singer

As dubbing artist

References

External links

 

Male actors from Andhra Pradesh
Living people
Telugu male actors
Indian male film actors
Indian male stage actors
Male actors in Tamil cinema
Male actors in Hindi cinema
Telugu comedians
Nandi Award winners
Recipients of the Padma Shri in arts
People from Krishna district
Members of the Andhra Pradesh Legislative Assembly
Bharatiya Janata Party politicians from Andhra Pradesh
Male actors in Telugu theatre
Indian actor-politicians
Male actors from Vijayawada
Indian male comedians
20th-century Indian male actors
21st-century Indian male actors
Politicians from Vijayawada
1947 births